Roque Augusto Saldías Maninat (May 5, 1892 – May 17, 1974) was a Venezuelan-born Peruvian admiral and politician. He was born in Valencia, Carabobo, Venezuela. He returned to Peru with his family in 1895. In 1908, he enrolled at the Naval Academy of Peru and graduated in 1912. He went to France on the cruiser Comandante Aguirre and returned to Peru in 1915. He later served on the cruiser Almirante Grau. He was minister of health (1936–1937), navy and aviation (1937–1939), navy (1948–1955) and economy and finance (February–June 1948) in the Government of Peru. He served under Presidents Óscar Benavides, José Bustamante y Rivero and Manuel A. Odría. He eventually rose to the rank of vice admiral in the Peruvian Navy.

References

Chirinos Soto, Enrique: Historia de la República / 1930 -1985. Tomo II. Desde Sánchez Cerro hasta Alan García. Lima, AFA Editores, 1985.
Ortiz Sotelo, Jorge – Castañeda Martos, Alicia: Diccionario Biográfico Marítimo Peruano. Asociación de Historia Marítima y Naval Iberoamericana, Lima, 2007. Impreso por Jhire Grafel S.R.L. 
El Mariscal Benavides, su vida y su obra. 1976, 1981. Lima, Editorial Atlántida, 2 volúmenes.
Llosa Pazos, Juan Carlos: El Vicealmirante Roque Saldías Maninat y la modernización de la Armada del Perú,  Revista de Marina Volumen N° 1 2005

External links

1892 births
1974 deaths
People from Valencia, Venezuela
Peruvian sailors
Prime Ministers of Peru
Peruvian Ministers of Health
Peruvian Ministers of Economy and Finance
Emigrants from Venezuela to Peru